Denaro is an unincorporated community located in Amelia County, in the U.S. state of Virginia. Denaro is located 0.4 miles (0.64 kilometres) north of the Amelia-Nottoway county line at the split & curve junctions of SR 614 (Dennisville Road) and SR 613 (Namozine Road). The community was a post village in the 1900s, the post office has since closed.

References

Unincorporated communities in Virginia
Unincorporated communities in Amelia County, Virginia